Giorgio Sommer (1834–1914) was one of Europe’s most important and prolific photographers of the 19th century. Active from 1857 to 1888, he produced thousands of images of archeological ruins, landscapes, art objects and portraits.

He was born in Frankfurt am Main (modern-day Germany), where he studied business. Sommer opened his first photography studio in Switzerland, where he made relief images of mountains for the Swiss government. In 1856 moved his business to Naples and later (1866) formed a partnership with fellow German photographer Edmund Behles (also known as Edmondo Behles), who owned a studio in Rome. Operating from their respective Naples and Rome studios, Sommer and Behles became one of the largest and most prolific photography concerns in Italy.

He held studios in Naples at:
 Strada di Chiaia 168
 Via Monte di Dio 4 and 8
 Piazza della Vittoria

Sommer's catalog included images from the Vatican Museum, the National Archeological Museum at Naples, the Roman ruins at Pompeii, as well as street and architectural scenes of Naples, Florence, Rome, Capri and Sicily. Most notably, Sommer published his comprehensive album Dintorni di Napoli, which contained over one hundred images of everyday scenes in Naples. In April 1872, he documented a very large eruption of Mount Vesuvius in a series of stunning photographs.

Sommer and Behles exhibited extensively and earned numerous honors and prizes for their work (London 1862, Paris 1867, Vienna 1873, Nuremberg 1885). At one time, Sommer was appointed official photographer to King Victor Emmanuel II of Italy.

Sommer was involved in every aspect of the photography business. He published his own images that he sold in his studios and to customers across Europe. In later years, he photographed custom images for book illustrations, as well as printing his own albums and postcards. Sommer worked in all the popular formats of his day: carte de visite, stereoview, and large albumen prints (approximately ) which were sold individually and in bound albums.

The partnership with Behles ended in 1874, after which each photographer continued his own business. In Naples, Sommer opened a total of four additional studios: at No. 4 and No. 8 Monte di Dio, No. 5 Magazzino S. Caterina, and a last at Piazza della Vittoria.

Sommer died in Naples in 1914.

References

Gallery

External links 

 
 Biography  (in German)
 Images at Harvard University Art Museums
 Artnet
 Images of Pompeii in 1870
 Images of Fine Arts Museum of San Francisco

1834 births
1914 deaths
Photographers from Frankfurt
19th-century Italian photographers
19th-century Swiss photographers
German emigrants to Italy
German expatriates in Switzerland